Dylan Pritchard (born November 1, 1993) is a soccer player who plays college soccer for the Boston College Eagles and internationally for the Bahamas national team.

References

1993 births
Living people
American soccer players
Bahamian footballers
Bahamas international footballers
Association football defenders